Nicolas Slonimsky ( – December 25, 1995), born Nikolai Leonidovich Slonimskiy, was a Russian-born American conductor, author, pianist, composer and lexicographer. Best known for his writing and musical reference work, he wrote the Thesaurus of Scales and Melodic Patterns and the Lexicon of Musical Invective, and edited Baker's Biographical Dictionary of Musicians.

His life

Early life in Russia and Europe
Slonimsky was born Nikolai Leonidovich Slonimskiy in Saint Petersburg. He was of Jewish origin; his grandfather was Rabbi Chaim Zelig Slonimsky. His parents adopted the Orthodox faith after the birth of his older brother, and Nicolas was baptized in the Russian Orthodox Church. His maternal aunt, Isabelle Vengerova, later a founder of Philadelphia's Curtis Institute of Music, was his first piano teacher.

He grew up in the intelligentsia. After the Russian Revolution of 1917, he moved south, first to Kyiv, then to Constantinople, and ultimately to Paris, where many other Russian musicians and his sister Yulia Slonimskaya Sazonova had already fled. He worked as accompanist to conductor Serge Koussevitzky, and he toured Europe in 1921–22 as accompanist to tenor Vladimir Rosing. In 1923, Rosing became director of opera at the Eastman School of Music in Rochester, New York, and he invited Slonimsky to join him.

Slonimsky's younger brother, Mikhail, remained in Russia and became an author. His nephew, Sergei Slonimsky, became a composer.

Conducting career

In Rochester, Slonimsky continued his composition and conducting studies, with Albert Coates and Eugene Goossens, and accompanied Rosing at many vocal recitals, including a performance at Carnegie Hall in October 1924. After two years, he moved to Boston, where Koussevitzky had become conductor of the Boston Symphony Orchestra, and resumed his position as his pianist and now bilingual secretary. During this time, Slonimsky taught music theory at the Boston Conservatory and the Malkin Conservatory, and began to write music articles for The Boston Evening Transcript, The Christian Science Monitor and the magazine The Etude.

Slonimsky began writing songs and other incidental pieces, and performed as a piano soloist and vocal accompanist. In 1927 he formed the Boston Chamber Orchestra, for which he solicited music from contemporary composers. Slonimsky was a great champion of contemporary music, and through his interest in performing it met Henry Cowell and Charles Ives. He conducted the world premieres of Ives' Three Places in New England in 1931 (in New York's Town Hall), Edgard Varèse's Ionisation for thirteen percussionists in 1933, and various other works.

In 1931 Slonimsky married Dorothy Adlow, art critic of The Christian Science Monitor. She was active as a critic and lectured extensively around the U.S., serving on panels and art juries. They married in Paris, with Varèse as best man. Their daughter, Electra, later edited his letters and collected works.

In 1932, Slonimsky conducted a series of concerts in Havana highlighting Ives, Ruggles, Cowell, Amadeo Roldán and Alejandro García Caturla. He then traveled to Paris, Berlin and Budapest to conduct further concerts. He mentioned at the time he found conducting to be "the nearest approximation to music in motion". Thanks to the popularity of these tours, he was invited to conduct five concerts in the Hollywood Bowl in the summer of 1933. These were controversial and received mixed critical reviews.

Writings and musical criticism 
Throughout his life, Slonimsky wrote extensively for periodicals and newspapers, produced program and liner notes, and contributed to numerous reference works. He described himself as a "diaskeuast" (from Greek διασκευαστής), a "reviser or interpolator". When his conducting career slowed, he spent more time writing about music. He produced the chronology Music Since 1900, and later after travelling in Latin America, produced the first thorough coverage in English, Music of Latin America. In 1947 he published the Thesaurus of Scales and Melodic Patterns, which would later become one of his most influential works as a sourcebook for composers and performers. The book influenced many jazz musicians and composers, including Allan Holdsworth, John Coltrane, Frank Zappa, Paul Grabowsky, and Steve Rochinski, and remained in print 60 years later, but was largely ignored for years after its publication. Quincy Jones said in a February 2018 interview: "Every time I used to see Coltrane he'd have Nicolas Slonimsky's book."

Two books for children followed, The Road to Music and A Thing or Two About Music, with jokes, anecdotes and puzzles. Then in 1953, Slonimsky brought out the Lexicon of Musical Invective ("Critical Assaults on Composers since Beethoven's Time"), a collection of hilariously scathing, insulting, vituperative, and enraged contemporary critiques of musical greats in their time. In 1958, he became editor of Baker's Biographical Dictionary of Musicians, developing a reputation for factual accuracy, and remained its head editor until 1992.

Later life and work 
In 1964 Slonimsky's wife died and he moved to Los Angeles. He taught at UCLA for three years, and lectured and spoke about music, introducing himself to classes by spelling out his name: "Slonimsky. S–L–O as in 'slow', N–I–M as in 'nimble', S–K–Y as in 'sky'." He possessed a sly sense of humor, and was a regular guest on radio and television programs, including Johnny Carson's Tonight Show. New York public television station WNET filmed an interview with him for the "Aging" segment of the PBS series The Mind.

He became a friend of avant-garde composer and rock guitarist Frank Zappa, and performed some of his own compositions at a Zappa concert in Santa Monica, California, in 1981. He named his cat Grody-to-the-Max after learning the phrase from Zappa's daughter Moon Zappa.

Slonimsky wrote the Lectionary of Music as a "reading dictionary," as he called it. Then in 1988, he published his autobiography, Perfect Pitch, filled with anecdotes about musical figures of the 20th century, including his mentors and colleagues.

For his 98th birthday, he visited Saint Petersburg to participate in a music festival. A documentary of his life including video of this visit, A Touch of Genius, was broadcast by Film America on his 100th birthday. He died in Los Angeles in 1995 at the age of 101, 4 years after the Dissolution of the Soviet Union. His papers are archived in the Library of Congress.

Compositions

Piano 

 Minitudes
 Variations on a Kindergarten Tune
 Yellowstone Park Suite
 Russian Nocturne
 Two Etudes
 Silhouettes Iberiennes
 Russian Prelude
 Modinha
 Variations on a Brazilian Tune (My Toy Balloon)
 Studies in Black and White

Chamber music 

 Muss Perpetuo
 Suite (Сюита)
 Piccolo Divertimento
 Quaquaversal Suite

Commercial and satire 

 Five Advertising Songs
 Gravestones at Hancock, New Hampshire (1945)
 A Very Great Musician
 I Owe a Debt to A Monkey (A Humorous Encore Song)

Writings

Books 
 Music Since 1900 (1937)
 Supplement to Music since 1900 (1986)
 Music of Latin America (1945)
 Thesaurus of Scales and Melodic Patterns (1947)
 The Road to Music New York (1947)
 A Thing or Two about Music (1948)
 Lexicon of Musical Invective (1953)
 Baker's Biographical Dictionary of Musicians (1958).
 The Concise Baker's Biographical Dictionary of Musicians (1987)
 Perfect Pitch (1988)
 Lectionary of Music (1989)

Collected writings 
 Nicolas Slonimsky: The First Hundred Years (1994)
 The Great Composers and Their Works (Reissued as The Listener's Companion) (2000)
 Nicolas Slonimsky: Writings on Music (2004)
 Dear Dorothy – Letters from Nicolas Slonimsky to Dorothy Adlow (2012)

Notes

References

External links

 Nicolas Slonimsky web site
 
 Nicolas Slonimsky In Memoriam (from Other Minds)
 Interview with Nicolas Slonimsky, April 12, 1986
 "Transformation and Adaptation: The Evolution of Charles Ives's Song 'From "Paracelsus" " by Felix Meyer (2004), Library of Congress

Listening to Slonimsky
 Newmillenniumrecords.com, Doug Ordunio of KFAC converses with Slonimsky at his home, 1979
 Speaking of Music, Charles Amirkhanian of KPFA talks to Slonimsky, 1987
 Music & Conversation with Slonimsky at his home in Los Angeles, 1979
 Ode to Gravity, Music by and for Slonimsky on his 97th birthday (with Charles Amirkhanian, June 1991)
 Slonimsky at 76, Slonimsky discusses Igor Stravinsky and Charles Ives with Charles Amirkhanian and Robert Commanday, 1971
 On Frank Zappa, Slonimsky discusses his relationship with Frank Zappa, 1983
 A dinner at Mrs. Antheil's house, Slonimsky shares roast duck with Charles Amirkhanian, Carol Law and the widow of composer George Antheil, 1971
 Lecture at Berkeley Piano Club, 1971
 On Shostakovich, after the composer's death, 1975, Slonimsky discusses the work of Dmitri Shostakovich
 A program on the elder statesmen of American music, including Slonimsky
 Slonimsky talks with David Cloud on the 40th anniversary of the world premiere of Varèse's Ionisation (Varèse), 1973

1894 births
1995 deaths
Eastman School of Music alumni
New England Conservatory faculty
Boston Evening Transcript people
Jewish American classical composers
20th-century classical composers
Russian classical composers
Russian male classical composers
20th-century American musicologists
Russian musicologists
American male classical pianists
Jewish classical pianists
20th-century classical pianists
20th-century Russian male musicians
American lexicographers
Russian centenarians
American centenarians
Men centenarians
American people of Russian-Jewish descent
Emigrants from the Russian Empire to the United States
Russian Jews